West Hollywood is a neighborhood in Broward County, Florida,  United States.  The ZIP code for the community is 33023. The community is within the city limits of Hollywood. The latest population for the area recorded was 60,806. West Hollywood reported as an "unincorporated place" by the U.S. Census Bureau in 1950, when the population count totaled 1,196.

Geography
West Hollywood is located at 26.021 degrees north, 80.184  degrees west (26.021, -80.184). The elevation for the community is 10 feet above sea level. The community is bounded by Davie Road Extension and 72nd Avenue to the west, Stirling Road to the north, Florida Turnpike to the east and Hollywood Boulevard to the south.
This area includes the residential areas of Boulevard Heights and Driftwood.

Demographics

The median income for the community is $43,113 and the median age is 31.79.

Education
The community of West Hollywood is served by Broward County Public Schools.

References

Neighborhoods in Hollywood, Florida
Former census-designated places in Broward County, Florida
Former municipalities in Florida
Former census-designated places in Florida